The Garbage tour was the debut concert tour by American rock band Garbage, in support of their self-titled debut album (1995). It began on November 5, 1995, in Minneapolis, Minnesota, and ended on December 18, 1996, in Inglewood, California. For the duration of the tour, Garbage's touring line-up was augmented by Daniel Shulman, who had previously been a session musician for Run-D.M.C., on bass guitar. Samplers and MIDI controllers helped the bandmembers to unleash on stage the varied sounds that augmented the studio versions of the songs. Despite all the members of the group having racked up years of touring experience between them prior to forming, Garbage had no initial plans to tour their debut set; they changed their mind when they found that they enjoyed themselves while filming the music video for their debut single, "Vow". Director Samuel Bayer had encouraged the group to play the song live as he filmed them, rather than playing along to a backing track.

The Garbage tour started off with low-key headlining shows in late 1995, during which time the band visited a number of media cities in North America and Europe. The band spent the following year on tour, performing as the main act, spending two separate runs as an opening act for the Smashing Pumpkins on their Infinite Sadness arena tour, performing on TV and radio shows and performing on the bill at rock and radio festivals around the world. A number of notable acts supported Garbage throughout the run of the tour, including Acetone, Ash, Bis, The Elevator Drops, Fun Lovin' Criminals, The Rentals, Placebo, Polyanna and Polara. The tour was booked by Kevin Gasser of Creative Artists Agency. Before the 1996 concerts, the band reworked the songs to make them work better live, and also adopted more MIDI guitars to use less keyboards on stage.

Video camera footage shot by Garbage during the early 1996 tour dates was incorporated into both that year's opening titles of the band's first long-form VHS and VCD compilation, Garbage Video, and the band's hour-long retrospective documentary, Thanks For Your Uhhh, Support, which featured on the group's 2007 greatest hits DVD Absolute Garbage.

Tour dates

Promotional performances

Setlists

The first full concert in Minneapolis saw Garbage debut a fourteen-song set, launching with "Supervixen". The initial set included eleven songs from their debut album and three b-sides: "Subhuman", "Girl Don't Come" and "Trip My Wire". For radio festivals, Garbage performed around five tracks, usually starting with "Stupid Girl".

Garbage launched their 1996 tour in Dallas, Texas by reordering the set, swapping "Subhuman" and "Milk" around and moving "Queer" to the start of the night. The arrangement of "Queer" is based upon a Danny Saber remix of the song. Garbage debuted an electronica version of "Dog New Tricks" and a cover version of Vic Chesnutt's "Kick My Ass" at the start of the run, while also dropping both "As Heaven is Wide" and "A Stroke of Luck". This set list remains largely unchanged for over six months, although "Subhuman" is dropped following a performance in Boston's Avalon, and both the song and "As Heaven is Wide" are intermittently played as an encore towards the end of the run.

The end of 1996 and Garbage's support slot for the Smashing Pumpkins meant that the band finished the year performing an abbreviated set. Apart from at one final headline show in New York City's Beacon Theatre, "Supervixen", "Dog New Tricks", "Kick My Ass" and "Girl Don't Come" are retired. Garbage perform a new guitar-heavy arrangement of "Milk" a number of times before it is dropped. The run of shows also saw Garbage debut two songs live: a second Vic Chesnutt cover version ("Supernatural") and their early b-side "#1 Crush", which later replaces it.

Box office score data

References

External links
Garbage official website
Garbage setlist archive: 1995/1996

1995 concert tours
1996 concert tours
Garbage (band) concert tours